Independence Pass may refer to:
 Independence Pass (Colorado), a mountain pass on the Continental Divide of the Americas in the Sawatch Range of Colorado, United States.
 Independence Pass (Washington), a pass in Skamania County, Washington, United States.

See also